Queers is a 2017 drama directed and produced by Mark Gatiss. It was created as part of the BBC's cycle "Gay Britannia", to mark the 50th anniversary of the passing of the Sexual Offences Act 1967. The show features interviews with gay characters at the margins of the community. It was broadcast by BBC America in collaboration with AMC Networks.

Episodes 
The series has a total of 8 episodes, each consisting of one monologue. Every episode features a different speaker in a different year, spanning most of the 20th and the beginning of the 21st century.

Cast and characters  
From IMDB:
 Ben Whishaw as Perce, a soldier in World War I
 Fionn Whitehead as Andrew, a young man who took part in the protests after the defeat of a proposed amendment that would have equalized the age of consent of same-sex sexual activities to 16
 Russell Tovey as Phil, an actor
 Rebecca Front as Alice, the wife of a closeted gay man
 Ian Gelder as Jackie, a tailor recalling his experiences in World War II London
 Kadiff Kirwan as Fredrick, as an immigrant from the West Indies
 Gemma Whelan as Bobby, a woman posing as a gentleman
 Alan Cumming as Steve, a man preparing his wedding speech

Reception 
The Independent, discussing the visceral nature of the eight episodes, called them "dramatic gems". The Times said that the show was "funny, poignant and closely observed".

References

External links 
 
 

2017 British television series debuts
2017 British television series endings
2010s British drama television series
2010s British television miniseries
BBC television dramas
BBC television miniseries
2010s British LGBT-related television series
English-language television shows